Riga Football Cup was a knockout tournament held in Latvian football between 1925 and 1936. In 1937 it was replaced by the Latvian Football Cup. Clubs from other cities than Riga were allowed to participate in the tournament.

References

Defunct football competitions in Latvia
Football cup competitions in Latvia